Wild Gremlinz is the second studio album by American rapper Nature. It was released in 2002 via Sequence/Columbia Records.

Track listing
"Intro" — 1:26
"The Wake Up" — 0:59
"Wild Gremlinz" featuring Masta, Dog & Young Katz — 3:21
"So Fresh" — 3:53
"The Ride" — 3:03
"I Don't Give a Fuck" — 1:34
"Take That" — 4:16
"Love That Hoe" featuring Bars & Young Katz — 4:20
"What Cha Know" — 3:26
"Get Gully" — 4:10
"Who R U?" featuring Killz & Sabotage — 3:11
"Supa High" — 3:39
"Life & Death" — 4:08
"Coming Home with Me" featuring Killz — 4:23
"Disturbin' the Peace" — 4:03

Charts

References

External links

2002 albums
Nature (rapper) albums